Michael Beaudry (born July 13, 1997) is a professional Canadian football quarterback and fullback for the Edmonton Elks of the Canadian Football League (CFL).

Early life and high school
Beaudry was born and grew up in Regina, Saskatchewan until his family moved to Oviedo, Florida when he was 11 years old. He attended Paul J. Hagerty High School and was named All-Seminole County Athletic Conference as a senior. Beaudry committed to play college football West Florida, which had just formed a team, and was the first recruit to sign a National Letter of Intent with the program.

College career
Beaudry began his college career at West Florida (UWF) as part of the Argonauts' inaugural roster. He broke his fibula during spring practices before UWF's first season. Beaudry was named the Argonauts starting quarterback going into his redshirt freshman season. He was named the Gulf South Conference Offensive Freshman of the Year after passing for 3,215 yards and 29 touchdowns as UWF advanced to the NCAA Division II Football Championship game. Beaudry suffered a season-ending injury during the first quarter of West Florida's season opener in 2018. Following the end of the season he entered the NCAA transfer portal.

Beaudry ultimately transferred to UConn. He was named the Huskies starting quarterback going into the 2019 season. Beaudry played in five games before suffering an injury and completed 53-of-83 pass attempts for 503 yards and one touchdown with two interceptions.

After one season at UConn, Beadry transferred a second time to Idaho as a graduate transfer. He started all four of the Vandals' games during his first season with the team, which was played in the spring after being postponed due to COVID-19. Beaudry finished the season with 73 completions on 122 pass attempts for 794 yards with three touchdowns and three interceptions while also rushing 25 times for 97 yards and one touchdown. He decided to utilize the extra year of eligibility granted to college athletes who played in the 2020 season due to the coronavirus pandemic and return to Idaho for a second season. Beaudry played in seven games with six starts in 2021 and passed 1,299 yards with four touchdowns and six interceptions.

Professional career
Beadry was signed by Edmonton Elks of the Canadian Football League on April 12, 2022.

References

External links
West Florida Argonauts bio
UConn Huskies bio
Idaho Vandals bio
Edmonton Elks bio

1997 births
Living people
Canadian football quarterbacks
American football quarterbacks
Canadian football fullbacks
Idaho Vandals football players
Players of American football from Florida
Edmonton Elks players
West Florida Argonauts football players
UConn Huskies football players
Sportspeople from Regina, Saskatchewan
Sportspeople from Seminole County, Florida